The 2020–21 Santa Clara Broncos men's basketball team represented Santa Clara University during the 2020–21 NCAA Division I men's basketball season. The Broncos were led by fifth-year head coach Herb Sendek and played their home games at the Leavey Center as members of the West Coast Conference.

Previous season
The Broncos finished the 2019–20 season 20–13, 6–10 in WCC play to finish in seventh place. They defeated Portland in the first round of the WCC tournament before losing in the second round to Pepperdine.

Departures

Incoming Transfers

Recruiting

Recruiting class of 2021

Roster

Schedule and results

|-
!colspan=9 style=| Non-conference regular season

|-
!colspan=9 style=| WCC regular season

|-
!colspan=9 style=| WCC tournament

Source:

References

Santa Clara Broncos men's basketball seasons
Santa Clara
Santa Clara
Santa Clara